The  is the 3rd edition of the Japan Film Professional Awards. It awarded the best of 1993 in film. The ceremony took place on March 10, 1994, at Cinema Argo Shinjuku in Tokyo.

Awards 
Best Film: All Under the Moon (WOWOW Special Drama J Movie Wars Edition)
Best Director: Toshihiro Tenma (Kyōso Tanjō)
Best Actress: Hikari Ishida (Haruka, Nosutarujī)
Best Actor: Ryo Ishibashi (All Under the Moon)
Best New Encouragement: Hikari Ōta (Kusa no Ue no Shigoto)
Best New Encouragement: Aya Kokumai (Sonatine, Kyōso Tanjō)
Best New Director: Tetsuo Shinohara (Kusa no Ue no Shigoto)
Best New Director: Shinobu Yaguchi (Hadashi no Picnic)

10 best films
 All Under the Moon J Movie Wars Edition (Yoichi Sai)
 Tsuge Yoshiharu World: Gensenkan Shujin (Teruo Ishii)
 Kusa no Ue no Shigoto (Tetsuo Shinohara)
 Hadashi no Picnic (Shinobu Yaguchi)
 Kyōso Tanjō (Toshihiro Tenma)
 Graduation Journey: I Came from Japan (Shusuke Kaneko)
 Human Scramble: Furyō (Banmei Takahashi)
 Patlabor 2: The Movie (Mamoru Oshii)
 Gokudō Kisha (Rokurō Mochizuki)
 Sora ga Konnani Aoi Wake ga Nai (Akira Emoto)

References

External links
  

Japan Film Professional Awards
1994 in Japanese cinema
Japan Film Professional Awards
March 1994 events in Asia